In association football, shooting is hitting the ball in an attempt to score a goal. It is usually done using the feet or head. A shot on target or shot on goal is a shot that enters the goal or would have entered the goal if it had not been blocked by the goalkeeper or another defensive player.

Types of shots

Depending on the part of the body used

 Standard shot: To perform a standard shot, the player goes to the ball at a slight angle and kicks the ball with the area around the knuckle of the big toe.
 Straight shot / Instep drive: To do a straight kick, a player comes at the ball straight then kicks it with the laces of his foot (ankle is locked). The straight shot is easier to keep low than standard shot since it’s hard to follow through with the kicking leg high in the air. The shot is powerful but less accurate.
 Inside foot shot: To perform an inside shot, the player moves their hip outside and then kicks the ball with the middle of the inside of the foot for a curve effect.
 Outside foot shot / trivela: To do an outside foot shot, the ball is hit with the outside three toes of the foot to get a curve effect. Ricardo Quaresma has used this type of shot on many occasions. 
 Toe shot  / Toe punt: To do a toe shot, the player sticks his leg forwards and kicks the ball with his toe. Leg is not moved back to build momentum like when performing every other type of soccer shot. Used with less frequency, and also known as the "toe poke", it is a quick strike which requires little motion, and is often utilized to fool or surprise opponents who would normally not expect this type of shot, such as when Ronaldo used it to score Brazil's decisive goal in the semi-final of the 2002 World Cup against Turkey.
 Header: the player hits the ball with their head. This is sometimes necessary when the ball is too high to control with the feet or chest. 

Players also sometimes use the chest or the back to pass the ball at a teammate or as part of a dribbling motion. Examples are Ronaldinho and Cristiano Ronaldo.

Depending on the ball movement

These types of shots are usually used most in free kicks, corner kicks and shots on goal. 
Bending shot / Swerve shot / Curl: Sometimes called curve. Any part of the foot can be used to do a bending shot, but using the inside or outside parts produce the most bend. To do a bending shot,the player kicks the sides of the ball at an angle. If he uses the inside of the foot,  he wraps his leg around the ball and follows through to the outside of his body. If he is using the area around the knuckle of his big toe or the outside of the foot he follows through across his body. Is usually but not exclusively used in free kicks. The ball bends or swerves in such a way that it beats the keeper; the only drawback is that it lacks great power.
Straight curl (Dip or Dipping shot): The topspin technique of putting straight curl on a ball is known as a dip.
Knuckleball: A shot that has no or very little spin and has erratic movement. The shot is generally taken from distance to give the ball time to show this effect, and works best when the ball is still. Didi, Juninho Pernambucano, Roberto Carlos, Andrea Pirlo, Cristiano Ronaldo and Gareth Bale are known for using this technique.
 Driven shot / Power shot (can be High or Low): A powerful shot that usually goes straight and has a direct trajectory. 
 Deadball: Not a special type of shot but a result of different shots. It is reflected in a sudden drop or dip of the ball. It can be a result of a knuckleball shot or a straight curl. In the case of the latter it is called top spin deadball or dipping deadball. Not every knuckleball shot is a deadball.

Special (Trick) shots

Backheel: this technique is done by hitting the ball with the heel. It can be used to shoot or pass the ball, and is also a quick way to pass backwards without having to turn. Many players have scored goals like this, such as Cristiano Ronaldo, Thierry Henry, and Zlatan Ibrahimović.
 Chip shot / Lob: This shot focuses on getting the ball to a certain amount of vertical height, where the goalkeeper can't reach it and then have it come back down again into goal. It takes a certain amount of technique and precision to do and players such as Raúl González, Cristiano Ronaldo, Roberto Baggio, Romário, Francesco Totti, and Lionel Messi have made it trademark moves.

 Panenka: A chipped penalty invented by Antonín Panenka in 1976, for who it is named for. Players such as Zinedine Zidane, Francesco Totti, and Lionel Messi have performed it. 

Volley / Half volley / Donkey kick: When the heel is used to volley the ball over the player's head (from back to front).
Bicycle kick / Scissors kick / Overhead kick: An acrobatic strike where a player kicks a ball in midair with the instep. It is achieved by throwing the body backward up into the air and, before descending to the ground, making a scissor movement with the legs to get the ball-striking leg in front of the other.
Rabona: The kicking leg is wrapped behind the standing leg to kick the ball. The legs end up crossed as the ball is kicked.  
Scorpion kick / Reverse bicycle kick: The ball is kicked with the back or heel of the lower body while jumping in midair to hit the ball forward. Colombian goalkeeper René Higuita did this move against England.
Rainbow kick / Lambreta / Coup du Sombrero : Most usually used as a dribbling move, but it can be used to pass the ball a very short distance.

See also

Cross

References 

Association football terminology
Association football skills